Association Sportive des Gendarmerie Nationale Nigérienne or simply AS GNN is  a Nigerien football club based in Niamey and sponsored by the National Forces for Intervention and Security (FNIS).

In 2011 the club was renamed from AS-FNIS to AS GNN.

Achievements
Niger Premier League: 4
2005, 2006, 2011, 2014.

Niger Cup: 2
2007, 2018.

Niger Super Cup: 1
2011.

Performance in CAF competitions
CAF Champions League: 3 appearances
2006 – Preliminary Round
2007 – First Round
2012 –

CAF Confederation Cup: 1 appearance
2008 – Preliminary Round

Current squad

References

 Niger Premier League, 2008. RSSSF Foundation.

Law enforcement in Niger
Football clubs in Niger
Super Ligue (Niger) clubs
Sport in Niamey
Association football clubs established in 1974
1974 establishments in Niger